Lutz Lischka (born 30 January 1944) is an Austrian judoka. He competed in the men's middleweight event at the 1972 Summer Olympics.

References

1944 births
Living people
Austrian male judoka
Olympic judoka of Austria
Judoka at the 1972 Summer Olympics
Sportspeople from Vienna
20th-century Austrian people